Irving Arnold Noren (November 29, 1924 – November 15, 2019) was an American professional baseball and basketball player. He was an outfielder in the Major Leagues from 1950 through 1960 for the Washington Senators, New York Yankees, Kansas City Athletics, St. Louis Cardinals, Chicago Cubs and Los Angeles Dodgers. He also played for the National Basketball League's Chicago American Gears in 1946–47. Later in his baseball career, Noren was a minor league manager and the third-base coach of the 1972–73 World Series champion Oakland Athletics. As a player and coach between 1950 and 1975, Noren was a member of five world championship teams. The last surviving member of the 1952 World Series champion Yankees, he died at his home in Oceanside, California, on November 15, 2019, exactly two weeks before his 95th birthday. 

Noren was born in Jamestown, New York, but grew up from the age of 12 in Pasadena, California, where he graduated from high school. Noren then attended Pasadena City College and played basketball as well as baseball. His collegiate career was interrupted by service in the United States Army during World War II.

Playing career
The ,  Noren threw and batted left-handed. His pro baseball career began in 1946 when he was signed by the Dodgers while they were still in Brooklyn, but 14 years and the transfer of the team to Los Angeles would pass before he'd wear a Dodger uniform. During his four seasons in Brooklyn's farm system, he was named Most Valuable Player of the 1948 Double-A Texas League. Then, in 1949, playing for an earlier "hometown" franchise, the Hollywood Stars, Noren won the Triple-A Pacific Coast League's MVP Award, hitting .330 with 224 hits, 29 home runs and 130 runs batted in.

But the Dodgers had no room for Noren in their outfield in Brooklyn and sold his contract to the American League Washington Senators at the close of the 1949 campaign. Noren responded with a standout 1950 rookie season. He batted .295, established career highs in hits (160), home runs (14) and RBI (98), and finished 15th in the league's MVP race. His sophomore season, saw only a slight falloff to a .279 batting average and 86 RBI. But 12 games into his third campaign with the Senators, Noren was sent on May 3 to the Yankees in a six-player trade that brought Jackie Jensen to Washington.

For the next 4 seasons, Noren would be a valuable platoon outfielder for Casey Stengel's Yankees, appearing in three World Series (1952; 1953; 1955), all against his original organization, Brooklyn. He started four games as the Yankees' centerfielder in the 1955 World Series, filling in, along with right-handed-swinging Bob Cerv, for an injured Mickey Mantle. But Noren went only 1-for-16 as Brooklyn captured its first world championship. He would hit only .148 (4-for-27) in the three Series in which he appeared. (He was a member of the victorious  Yankees, but did not get into that year's Fall Classic.) New York won 103 games that season, but finished second to the Cleveland Indians. All told, Noren hit .272 with 31 homers during his 488-game tenure in the Bronx.

Noren was traded to the Kansas City Athletics in February 1957. He batted over .300 for both the 1957 Cardinals and the 1959 Cubs, before closing his career back in Southern California with the transplanted Dodgers in 1960.

Altogether, Noren played in 1,093 games over 11 MLB seasons. He collected 857 hits, including 157 doubles, 35 triples and 65 home runs, with 453 RBI. He batted .275 lifetime. Defensively, he recorded a .982 fielding percentage playing at all three outfield positions and first base.

In addition to his baseball career, Noren played briefly with the Chicago American Gears of the National Basketball League in the 1946–47 season. He played in three games for the team that season.

Coaching career
After his playing days were over, Noren managed the Triple-A Hawaii Islanders in 1962–63, where he would fine players $50 if they showed up too sunburned to play baseball. The Islanders went 158–153 during those two seasons, but did not qualify for the Pacific Coast League playoffs. He scouted for the expansion Senators in 1964, spent 1965–69 out of professional baseball, then managed in the Pittsburgh Pirates' farm system in 1970.

From 1971 through 1973, Noren served on the coaching staff of Oakland A's manager Dick Williams, a fellow Pasadena High School alumnus and former minor league teammate. He was a member of the 1971 American League West Division champions, and then worked with two consecutive AL pennant-winners and World Series champions in 1972–73. When Williams resigned after the 1973 title, Noren remained on the Oakland staff of new manager Alvin Dark. But he and Dark clashed and on July 8, 1974, Noren was replaced as third-base coach by Bobby Winkles—denying Noren a third consecutive World Series title when the Athletics went on to defeat the Dodgers in that year's Fall Classic.

Noren then spent one more season in the big leagues as a coach with the 1975 Cubs.

References

External links

1924 births
2019 deaths
American people of Swedish descent
Baseball coaches from California
Baseball coaches from New York (state)
Baseball players from Pasadena, California
Baseball players from New York (state)
Chicago American Gears players
Chicago Cubs coaches
Chicago Cubs players
Fort Worth Cats players
Hawaii Islanders managers
Hawaii Islanders players
Hollywood Stars players
Kansas City Athletics players
Los Angeles Dodgers players
Major League Baseball outfielders
Major League Baseball third base coaches
Military personnel from New York (state)
Minor league baseball managers
New York Yankees players
Oakland Athletics coaches
Pacific Coast League MVP award winners
Pasadena City Lancers baseball players
Pasadena City Lancers men's basketball players
Pasadena High School (California) alumni
St. Louis Cardinals players
Santa Barbara Dodgers players
Sportspeople from Jamestown, New York
Sportspeople from Pasadena, California
Washington Senators (1901–1960) players
Washington Senators (1961–1971) scouts
United States Army personnel of World War II